NGC 511, also occasionally referred to as PGC 5103 or UGC 936, is an elliptical galaxy in the constellation Pisces. It is located approximately 499 million light-years from the Solar System and was discovered on 26 October 1876 by French astronomer Édouard Stephan.

Observation history 
Stephan discovered the object with the 31" silver-glass reflecting telescope at the Marseille Observatory. He described his discovery as diffuse, with two faint stars on the west side. The description and position given in his notes matches UGC 936 and PGC 5103, thus the objects are widely recognized as the same. John Louis Emil Dreyer, creator of the New General Catalogue, described the galaxy as "extremely faint, very small, small (faint) star involved, small star attached", with the two stars being the objects to the west of NGC 511.

Description 
The galaxy has an apparent size of 1.1 × 1.1 arcmins and a recessional velocity of approximately 10954 kilometers per second. It also contains multiple concentric rings. The distance of NGC 511 from the Solar System can be estimated using Hubble's law, which puts the object at nearly 500 million light-years from the Sun.

See also 
 Elliptical galaxy 
 List of NGC objects (1–1000)
 Pisces (constellation)

References

External links 

 
 SEDS

Elliptical galaxies
Pisces (constellation)
0511
5103
0936
Astronomical objects discovered in 1876
Discoveries by Édouard Stephan